John H. Van Engen is an American historian who focuses on the religious and intellectual culture of the European Middle Ages. He is Andrew V. Tackes Professor Emeritus of Medieval History at the University of Notre Dame.

Life
He graduated from Calvin College, with a BA, and from University of California, Los Angeles with a PhD (1976), where he studied with Gerhart Ladner. He also studied at Heidelberg University, with Peter Classen. He joined the faculty of the University of Notre Dame in 1977, and served as director of the Medieval Institute there from 1986 to 1998. He retired in 2017.

Awards
He is a 1984 Guggenheim Fellow, and 2011 Berlin Prize Fellow. His book, Sisters and Brothers of the Common Life: The Devotio Moderna and the World of the Later Middle Ages (University of Pennsylvania Press, 2008) won the 2009 John Gilmary Shea Prize, the 2010 Otto Gründler Book Prize, and the 2013 Haskins Medal.

Works

Thomas F. X. Noble, John Van Engen (eds), European Transformations: The Long Twelfth Century, University of Notre Dame Press, 2012,

References

21st-century American historians
21st-century American male writers
Berlin Prize recipients
Calvin University alumni
University of California, Los Angeles alumni
Heidelberg University alumni
University of Notre Dame faculty
Living people
Fellows of the Medieval Academy of America
Year of birth missing (living people)
Presidents of the American Society of Church History
American male non-fiction writers